The following is a list of Malayalam films released in 1968.

Mal
1968
Malayalam
 1968
1968 in Indian cinema